Anna Carena (30 January 1899 - 15 April 1990) was an Italian actress. She appeared in more than thirty films from 1941 to 1983.

Filmography

References

External links 

1899 births
1990 deaths
Italian film actresses